Urbanus Joseph Kioko (13 May 1928 − 2 March 2008) was a Kenyan Roman Catholic bishop.

Ordained to the priesthood on 8 January 1961, Kioko was named bishop of the Roman Catholic Diocese of Machakos, Kenya on 9 July 1973 and retired on 15 March 2003. He was buried on march 7  2008.

References

allafrica.com

1932 births
2008 deaths
People from Central Province (Kenya)
20th-century Roman Catholic bishops in Kenya
Roman Catholic bishops of Machakos
Kenyan Roman Catholic bishops